Willard W. Miles (February 6, 1845 – May 13, 1926) was a Vermont attorney and judge.  He was most notable for his service as an associate justice of the Vermont Supreme Court from 1905 to 1906, and again from 1917 to 1923.

Early life
Willard Wesbery Miles was born in Albany, Vermont on February 6, 1845, the son of Orin and Eunice (Clark) Miles.  He was educated in Albany, and attended academies in Barnston and Hatley, Quebec.

Start of career
Miles taught school in Albany and Craftsbury, and studied law with attorneys Charles I. Vail and William W. Grout.  He was admitted to the bar in 1872, and practiced in Albany and Craftsbury.  A Republican, he held local office in both towns, including serving as school superintendent in Albany in 1867 and Craftsbury in 1876, and Craftsbury Town Clerk from 1875 to 1881.  From 1872 to 1874 he represented Albany in the Vermont House of Representatives, and he represented Craftsbury in the Vermont House from 1878 to 1879.

In 1881, he moved to Barton, where he practiced law in partnership with Grout.  When Grout retired in 1888 in order to devote full time to his duties as a member of the Vermont House of Representatives, Miles continued the practice on his own.

From 1890 to 1894, Miles served as State's Attorney of Orleans County, and from 1894 to 1896 he represented Orleans County in the Vermont Senate.

In 1904, Miles was elected to represent Barton in the Vermont House; when Clarke C. Fitts resigned as a Representative to become Vermont Attorney General, Miles took his place as chairman of the House Judiciary Committee.

Career as a judge
Miles served in the Vermont House until 1905, when he was appointed as an associate justice of the Vermont Supreme Court.  He served until 1906, when a newly-enacted law reduced the size of the court and eliminated his seat.

When his position on the Supreme Court was eliminated, Miles was appointed a judge of the Vermont Superior Court.  He served in this position until 1917, when he was again appointed to the state Supreme Court.  He served as an associate justice until 1923, when he retired.  He was succeeded on the court by Fred M. Butler.

Retirement and death
In retirement, Miles continued to reside in Barton.  He died there on May 13, 1926, and was buried at Welcome O. Brown Cemetery in Barton.

Family
In 1872, Miles married Ellen M. Dow.  They were the parents of daughters Ida M. (1873-1969), Mabel A. (1875-1940), and Dorothy E. (1895-1895), and son Orin L. (1879-1888).

Mabel Augusta Miles was the wife of Frank D. Thompson (1876-1940), who served as an associate justice of the Vermont Supreme Court.  Thompson was the son of Laforrest H. Thompson, who also served on the state Supreme Court.

References

Sources

Books

Magazines

Newspapers

Internet

External links

1845 births
1926 deaths
People from Barton, Vermont
People from Craftsbury, Vermont
U.S. state supreme court judges admitted to the practice of law by reading law
Vermont lawyers
Republican Party members of the Vermont House of Representatives
Republican Party Vermont state senators
State's attorneys in Vermont
Justices of the Vermont Supreme Court
Burials in Vermont
19th-century American lawyers